Argo Factory (Persian: کارخانه آرگو), is a contemporary art museum and cultural centre housed in a former brewery in Tehran, Iran. Argo Factory is part of the Pejman Foundation’s sites.

History
Argo Factory is a 100 year old building which once used to be one of the major drink manufacturing factories in Iran during the 1960s and 1970s. Its construction dates back to early 1920s as one of the first industrial factories in Iran. It was closed down in 1970s due to environmental issues and it was not reopened after the Islamic Revolution. In 2016, Pejman Foundation acquired and reconstructed the Argo Factory and turned into one of its multiple sites. The factory got its name Argo, from "the name of the beer once made there".  It was closed down in 1970s due to environmental issues and after the Islamic Revolution, it was not reopened.

Architecture
In spite of its unique architectural features – high smokestacks and strategic geographical position at the heart of the city – the factory was taken for granted for many years and eventually turned into a tumbledown building for almost four decades. The factory has undergone two phases of renovation, the most recent during 2018/19. In partnership with New-York based architecture firm ASA North, Argo Factory transforms from nearly four decades of desertion and has received a lot of attention, such as winning the Aga Khan Award for Architecture in 2022.

Awards 
Due to its special design, Argo factory received a lot of attention and managed to receive major architectural awards at the global level.

In 2022, this building, along with two other Iranian projects, among 463 submitted works from 16 countries, was included in the list of final candidates for the Aga Khan Award for Architecture, and from this list, six projects were selected as the final winners. Argo Factory, redesigned by Ahmadreza Schricker (ASA North), was among these winners. The Aga Khan Award for Architecture is given in three-year periods, and its purpose is to identify and reward the concepts that in architecture, with a focus on contemporary design, social housing, development and improvement, restoration, reuse and protection of the area, as well as landscape design and environmental improvement, can address the needs of Muslim societies.

Argo Factory also won the 2022 Dezeen Architecture Award, organized by the Dezeen website, one of the world's most influential architecture and design websites. This annual award introduces the best architecture, interior decoration and design in the world, as well as unique studios and architects and designers, and is a benchmark for recognizing the best international designs and praising architects and designers around the world. These awards include three categories: architecture, interior and design, with 14 categories in each category. Finally, the final winner will be selected from each section and will be honored as the three special works of Dezeen Architecture Award.

In the fifth edition of these awards, Argo Factory was among the names of selected projects in the final stage or short list of this international competition in the cultural buildings section, and became the final winner of this section and also became the Dezeen Awards 2022 architecture project of the year.

Programs 

Argo Factory is part of Pejman Foundation’s constellation of sites. Pejman Foundation supports art and culture through a program of exhibitions, talks, and events.

Exhibitions 

 Neïl Beloufa - 2017
 Nose to Nose - Slavs and Tatars - 2017
 Elsewhere Interactive VR Installation - 2018
 Nazgol Ansarinia: The Room Becomes a Street - 2020
 “For the sake of Calmness” A project by Newsha Tavakolian - 2020
 “In the Midst” vol. 1 - 2021
 Video at Large Selection of videos from the collection of Paris Museum of Modern Art - 2021
 Mohsen Vaziri Moghaddam: Unrealised Projects - 2021
 Vanishing Point; A Selection of Pejman Collection - 2022
 “Truth Lies not in One Dream, but in Many” The One Thousand and One Nights of Pasolini narrated by Roberto Villa’s Photos - 2022

See Also 

 Art exhibition
 Modern and contemporary art in Iran
 Nonprofit organization

References

External links 

 Official Website

Contemporary Art
Architecture in Iran
Contemporary art galleries in Iran
Art museums and galleries in Iran
Tourist attractions in Tehran